Prunus rufa, called Himalayan cherry, is a species of cherry native to Nepal and Burma. It is used as an ornamental elsewhere for its striking shiny brown bark.

Description

Its calyx tubes are 11–15mm long and its leaf blades are 2.8–5cm long. The smooth bark is a shiny brown, with prominent horizontal lenticels, similar to the coppery-red bark of the Tibetan cherry, Prunus serrula and similar to but lighter than the mahogany-brown bark of Prunus himalaica. Its phenotype suggests close affinity with four other Himalayan species of Prunus; P. topkegolensis, P. harae, P. taplejungnica and P. singalilaensis. Some sources consider Prunus ferruginea to be a synonym.

References

External links
 

rufa
Cherries
Flora of East Himalaya
Ornamental trees